Cagdianao, officially the Municipality of Cagdianao (Surigaonon: Lungsod nan Cagdianao;), is a 3rd class municipality in the province of Dinagat Islands, Philippines. According to the 2020 census, it has a population of 18,350 people.

Etymology
Cagdianao is derived from kagdianao, an alternate form of yugien balaod, meaning "place where mangroves grow", from agdao, a local name for a species of mangrove.

History
RJ SALADAGA . On October 24, 2012, however, the Supreme Court reversed its ruling from the previous year, and upheld the constitutionality of RA 9355 and the creation of Dinagat Islands as a province.

Geography

Barangays
Cagdianao is politically subdivided into 14 barangays.
 Boa
 Cabunga-an
 Del Pilar
 Laguna
 Legaspi
 Ma-atas
 Mabini
 Nueva Estrella
 Poblacion
 R. Ecleo, Sr.
 San Jose
 Santa Rita
 Tigbao
 Valencia

Climate

Demographics

Economy

References

External links
 Cagdianao Profile at the DTI Cities and Municipalities Competitive Index
 [ Philippine Standard Geographic Code]
Site showing photos and Videos of Cagdianao

Municipalities of Dinagat Islands